Lucie Baudu (born 9 September 1993) is a French slalom canoeist who has competed at the international level since 2011.

She won two medals at the 2018 ICF Canoe Slalom World Championships in Rio de Janeiro with a gold in K1 team and a bronze in C1 team. She also won six medals at the European Championships with a gold (K1 team: 2019), three silvers (C1 team: 2018, 2022, K1 team: 2020) and two bronzes (C1 team: 2020, K1 team: 2017).

World Cup individual podiums

References

External links

Living people
French female canoeists
1993 births
Medalists at the ICF Canoe Slalom World Championships
People from Pithiviers
Sportspeople from Loiret